The Olympic Stadium is a multi-purpose stadium in Phnom Penh, Cambodia. It has a capacity of 70,000. Despite its name, the stadium has never hosted an Olympic Games.

History

Construction on the National Sports Complex started in 1963 and was completed in 1964. Designer Vann Molyvann made use of massive earthworks to create the stadium, digging up 500,000 cubic meters of earth to shape the grounds.

The stadium might have been built to host the 1963 Southeast Asian Peninsular Games, but the games were cancelled due to political problems in Cambodia. There was the short-lived GANEFO games, that were held in Phnom Penh, Cambodia in November 25~December 6, 1966 and were named 'First Asian GANEFO'.  The stadium did play host to appearances by visiting dignitaries and state occasions, and was the home of Cambodia's national athletics teams.

The stadium played a small and integral part in the 1966 FIFA World Cup, when North Korea faced Australia in qualification as the remaining two Asia/Oceania zone teams. 

As North Korea lacked diplomatic relations with most countries and did not have a FIFA-standard venue at the time, while the Australian immigration laws in force meant the North Korean team would be unlikely to receive visas to enter the country, finding a suitable venue for the match proved difficult until Chief of State Norodom Sihanouk, an ally of Kim Il-sung, informed FIFA the matches could be held in Phnom Penh.

The matches attracted 60,000 and 40,000 fans, with Sihanouk decreeing half would cheer for Australia, while the other half would cheer for the North Koreans. The matches were held on 21 November 1965 and on 24 November 1965, with North Korea winning both (6–1 and 3–1): as all fifteen African teams had withdrawn in protest after FIFA declined to allocate them a place in the final tournament, the Final Round was scratched and North Korea also qualified for the World Cup, where they reached the quarter-finals.

Among the facilities are Olympic size swimming pools for swimming and diving and an indoor volleyball court with a capacity of up to 8,000, now known as the Olympic Stadium Indoor Arena. The diving boards and swimming pools were restored in 2017 after years of disuse, and are now enjoyed daily by the general public.

During the Khmer Rouge era, the stadium was used as an execution site where officials of the Khmer Republic, formerly led by Lon Nol, were killed.

In the decades following the Khmer Rouge era, the stadium facilities fell into disrepair. In 2000, the stadium complex was redeveloped by a Taiwanese firm, the Yuanta Group, which refurbished the stadium and also redeveloped parcels of the complex into condominiums and commercial properties.

The stadium has come to be a popular attraction for Phnom Penh residents, who attend daily exercise sessions, as well as football games and other activities.

In May 2007, the Irish singer Ronan Keating performed in concert in the stadium's Indoor Arena, the first concert by a major international act in Cambodia.

In November–December 2007, the World Organization Volleyball for Disabled held its World Cup in the stadium's Indoor Arena, the first major international sporting event in Cambodia in more than 40 years. Cambodia, seeded fourth in the world, finished third.

In 2010, the stadium hosted all the football matches for the Cambodian Premier League, known for sponsorship purposes as the Metfone C-League.

In 2015, the stadium's grass pitch was replaced with artificial turf.

The 2023 Southeast Asian Games will not be held at the Olympic Stadium, but at a new stadium to be known as the Morodok Techo National Sports Complex.

During the COVID-19 pandemic in Cambodia, the stadium was used as a temporary testing facility and later used as an overflow hospital.

International matches

See also
Sport in Cambodia
List of Southeast Asia stadiums by capacity

References

Football venues in Cambodia
Athletics (track and field) venues in Cambodia
Cambodia
Sports venues completed in 1963
Buildings and structures in Phnom Penh
1963 establishments in Cambodia
Tourist attractions in Phnom Penh